Big Potato may refer to:

"Charlie Big Potato", song by Skunk Anansie
Robertson, New South Wales, home of the Big Potato
The Big Potato landmark in Robertson, New South Wales
Jamie O'Rourke and the Big Potato: An Irish Folktale, book by children's author Tomie dePaola
Big Potato, play written by Arthur Laurents
"Big Potato", nickname of baseball player Carlos Pascual
"The Big Potato", episode of children's television series Dora the Explorer
The Big Potato, nickname for Moscow
Big Potato, board game company
Doug, originally thought to be the largest potato recorded